Abdellatif Zeroual (1951 in Berrechid, Morocco14 November 1974 at "Derb Moulay Chérif"  in Casablanca) was a philosophy teacher and  member of the national committee of the  "Ila Al Amame" movement.

Abdellatif was the son of Haj Abdelkader Zeroual, a militant who fought the French before Morocco became independent.

In 1970, when the Moroccan authorities launched a crackdown on the Ila al-Amam movement, he went into hiding with Abraham Serfaty and was protected by Christine Daure-Serfaty. In 1973 he was sentenced to death in absentia by a Casablanca court. On November 5, 1974, he disappeared after being snatched by a group of plain-clothed men while on his way to a meeting.

A week later a body was registered at a hospital in Rabat, which human rights organisations claim to be his, although the Moroccan authorities have never confirmed this.

See also
Khadija Ryadi

References

1951 births
1974 deaths
Moroccan politicians
Moroccan torture victims
Victims of human rights abuses
Moroccan people who died in prison custody
20th-century Moroccan philosophers
People from Casablanca-Settat
People sentenced to death in absentia
Executed philosophers
People from Berrechid
Moroccan prisoners and detainees
Ila al-Amam (Morocco) politicians